Harmony is the sixth studio album by Canadian singer-songwriter Serena Ryder. The album was released on November 27, 2012 in Canada, and on August 27, 2013 in the USA. A French edition featuring bilingual versions of two songs was released for the Quebec market on September 24, 2013. It received three Juno Award Nominations in 2013, winning Adult Alternative Album with five more (pending) nominations the following year including Album of the Year.

Commercial performance
The album was certified gold by Music Canada on February 7, 2013, shipping 40,000 copies. The album attained platinum certification in July 2013.

In 2013, the album sold 74,000 copies in Canada.

Singles
The lead single, titled "Stompa", was released on September 27, 2012, in Canada, and then on February 26, 2013 to the US The song peaked at No. 8 on the Canadian Hot 100, after spending 16 weeks on the chart. The second Canadian single, titled "What I Wouldn't Do", was released in early November 2012, and has reached No. 8 on the Canadian Hot 100. The song "For You" "reinterprets" Screamin' Jay Hawkins' well-known "I Put a Spell on You" and shares a songwriting credit with his estate.

Track listing

Charts

Weekly charts

Year-end charts

References 

2012 albums
Serena Ryder albums
Albums produced by Jon Levine
Juno Award for Adult Alternative Album of the Year albums